A statue of Oliver Cromwell stands on Bridge Street in Warrington in Cheshire, England. It is a sculpture of Oliver Cromwell, Lord Protector of the Commonwealth of England, Scotland and Ireland. The statue was designed by John Bell and erected in 1899. The statue is one of four public statues of Cromwell in the United Kingdom and has been Grade II listed since September 1973 for its architectural merit.

Description and history
The statue was made by the London sculptor John Bell and was originally displayed at the 1862 London Exhibition, where it stood at the centre of a fountain. It was presented to the town in 1899 by local councilor Frederick Monks to mark the 300th anniversary of Cromwell's birth. It stands in front of Warrington Academy, and consists of a standing iron figure on a square plinth with a sword and bible. Cromwell is shown without his hat. It is inscribed with "Cromwell" as a signature. There was opposition to the statue from the local Irish community.

In a letter to the council in January 1899 Monks stated that:

The acceptance and erection of the statue was vigorously debated by Warrington Town Council.

See also
Statue of Oliver Cromwell, Manchester
Statue of Oliver Cromwell, St Ives
Statue of Oliver Cromwell, Westminster

References

1899 establishments in England
1862 sculptures
Warrington
Oliver Cromwell
Outdoor sculptures in England
Cromwell, Oliver
Monuments and memorials in Cheshire
Cromwell, Oliver, Warrington
Grade II listed buildings in Cheshire
Listed buildings in Warrington
Cast-iron sculptures
Books in art